Pyin Ma Ngote To is a 1981 Burmese black-and-white drama film, directed by starring Kawleikgyin Ne Win, Kyaw Hein, Nwet Nwet Mu, Yin Yin Aye and Eant Kyaw.

Cast
Kawleikgyin Ne Win as Chit San
Kyaw Hein as Maung Too
Nwet Nwet Mu as Khin Nu
Yin Yin Aye as Mi Cho
Eant Kyaw as Say Yoe

References

1981 films
1980s Burmese-language films
Films shot in Myanmar
Burmese black-and-white films
1981 drama films